Ageratinastrum is a group of plants in the sunflower family described as a genus in 1932.

The genus is native to tropical Africa.

Species
 Ageratinastrum goetzeanum (O.Hoffm.) Mattf.
 Ageratinastrum katangense Lisowski
 Ageratinastrum lejolyanum (Adamska & Lisowski) Kalanda 	
 Ageratinastrum palustre Wild & G.V.Pope
 Ageratinastrum polyphyllum (Baker) Mattf.

References

Asteraceae genera
Vernonieae